Cloud City may refer to:
 Floating city (science fiction)
 Cloud City, a floating city on the planet Bespin in the Star Wars universe
 Cloud City, a nickname for Allianz Field, a soccer stadium under construction in Saint Paul, Minnesota, inspired by its broadly similar appearance to the Star Wars location
 Cloud City, a dream location in an episode of the animated miniseries Over the Garden Wall
 The Cloud City Miners' Union, the group which initiated the Leadville Miners' strike in the 1890s